(born March 22, 1986 in Toyama, Toyama, Japan) is a Japanese singer-songwriter and musician.

Career 
On September 28, 2014, she performed at the CID-UNESCO World Dance Congress Japan at the Tokyo Disney's Ikspiari entertainment complex. On November 14, 2014, Tsuji, along with composer and musician Kento Masuda in Milan, Italy.

On December 6, 2014, Tsuji performed at the "Associazione dei Cavalieri di San Silvestro" celebration of Monumentalis Ecclesiae Sancti Silvestri Societas in Tivoli, Italy. In 2015, Tsuji joined as chorus on “We Are One” recording in LA such as today's We Are The World song. Produced by David Longoria, and more than 400 recording artists singing together.

On March 22, 2016, Tsuji released her 1st album Free Yourself, produced by Kento Masuda and  Gary Vandy. Free Yourself was recorded. Free Yourself features musicians Simone Tomassini as well as a 20-page booklet. She also received global recognition of the Global Music Awards and was honored as a winner with a silver medal for “Fly Away“ female vocalist of outstanding achievement from her latest release “Free Yourself“ (2016).

Discography

Studio albums 

Free Yourself (2016)

References

External links 

1986 births
Japanese women pop singers
Japanese women singer-songwriters
Japanese singer-songwriters
Living people
Singers from Tokyo
People from Toyama Prefecture
21st-century Japanese singers
21st-century Japanese women singers